This is a list of poems by William McGonagall that have been published in book form, either during the poet's life or subsequently. A number of others only appeared in broadsheets or in local newspapers and do not appear in this list.

Bibliography

References

External links 
 
 

McGonagall, William
Bibliographies by writer
Bibliographies of British writers